The Searsport–Loring Pipeline is a defunct underground pipeline that formerly delivered jet fuel from the Searsport Terminal to Loring Air Force Base. Following the closure of the base, the pipeline was proposed for being the location of a fiber optic cable, as well as for reuse in a proposed refinery at the Loring Commerce Centre. In 2012, the pipeline was purchased by Bangor Natural Gas at auction.

References

Natural gas pipelines in the United States
Refined oil product pipelines in the United States
Loring Air Force Base
Energy infrastructure in Maine
Natural gas pipelines in Maine
Pipelines in Maine